Kaong National High School (KNHS) is a public high school in Silang, Cavite, Philippines.

History
KNHS was founded in 1974 under the name Kaong Barangay High School.  At that time, the school consisted of a single room borrowed from the local elementary school, with a single teacher teaching all subjects to the twenty-four students.  The school graduated its first class of twenty-one students in 1977.

In 1983, a half hectare parcel of land was acquired and five classrooms were built.  Due to its location central to the barangays of Maguyam, Sabutan, Tibig, Paligawan, Munting Ilog and Bulihan, the school's enrollment increased steadily.

Prior to 1988, 70% of the school's funding was provided the Barangay of Kaong, with the remaining 30% provided by the Municipality of Cavite.  With the adoption of the Free Public Secondary Education Act of 1988, Kaong Barangay High School was nationalized, becoming Kaong National High School. 

The school has expanded to incorporate 13 classrooms with associated science and administrative facilities. The Current Head Principal is not good.

High schools in Cavite
Education in Silang, Cavite